Sparganothis illustris is a species of moth of the family Tortricidae. It is found on Honshu island in Japan.

The wingspan is 18–21 mm.

References

Moths described in 1975
Sparganothis
Moths of Japan
Taxa named by Józef Razowski